Narenjbon (also Romanized as Nārenjbon; also known as Nārenjak Bon) is a village in Kalej Rural District, in the Central District of Nowshahr County, Mazandaran Province, Iran. At the 2006 census, its population was 1,061, in 307 families. Also, Professor Sasan Kohnejad Narang Bin, a faculty member at the Ecole Normale Supérieure University in France, is originally from the village.

References 

Populated places in Nowshahr County